Phoma candelariellae is a species of lichenicolous (lichen-eating) fungus in the family Didymellaceae. It is found in the Central Anatolia Region of Turkey and in Ukraine, where it grows parasitically on the apothecia (fruiting structures) of the saxicolous (rock-dwelling) lichen Candelariella aurella.

Taxonomy

The fungus was formally described as a new species in 2016 by Zekiye Kocakaya and Mehmet Gökhan Halıcı.

Phoma candelariellae is the only member of Phoma that grows on lichen genus Candelariella. David Hawksworth and colleagues later expressed doubt about the placement of the taxon in genus Phoma, suggesting that a transfer may be necessary, "as the species does not appear to be congeneric with the type species of the genus".

Description

The conidiomata of Phoma candelariellae are in the form of pycnidia—spherical to pear-shaped reproductive structures, that begin more or less immersed in the host tissue, but later burst partially through the surface. These black spots are covered by a clear gelatinous sheath; their dimensions are typically in the range 98.5−117 by 74−103 μm. A 12 μm-diameter ostiole provides an opening for the release of abundant conidia, which themselves are more or less spherical with a smooth wall and a gelatinous sheath, contain a single internal oil droplet, and measure about 5 μm across.

Habitat and distribution

The only known host of Phoma candelariellae is Candelariella aurella. Infection by the fungus is pathogenic, causing discolouration (blackening) of the host tissue, and diminishing and ultimately destroing the hymenium of the infected apothecia.

At the time of its original publication, Phoma candelariellae had been documented from only two localities in the Central Anatolia Region of Turkey. The authors suggested that the fungus likely has a wider distribution, as the host is widely distributed in the Northern Hemisphere. This was confirmed when it was reported from the Zhytomyr, Kherson, and Mykolaiv regions of Ukraine.

References

candelariellae
Fungi described in 2016
Lichenicolous fungi
Fungi of Europe